The 1898 California gubernatorial election was held on November 8, 1898, to elect the governor of California.

Results

References

1898
California
gubernatorial
November 1898 events